Rudolf Kruse (born 12 September 1952 in Rotenburg/Wümme) is a German computer scientist and mathematician.

Education and professional career 

Rudolf Kruse obtained his diploma (Mathematics) degree in 1979 from the TU Braunschweig, Germany, and a PhD in Mathematics in 1980 as well as the venia legendi in Mathematics in 1984 from the same university. Following a short stay at the Fraunhofer Society, in 1986 he joined the University of Braunschweig as a professor of computer science. From 1996–2017 he was a full professor at the Department of Computer Science of the Otto-von-Guericke Universität Magdeburg where he has been leading the computational intelligence research group. Since October 2017 he has been an emeritus professor.

Research activities 
He has carried out research and projects in statistics, artificial intelligence, expert systems, Fuzzy control, fuzzy data analysis, Computational Intelligence, and information mining. His research group was very successful in various industrial applications.

Rudolf Kruse has coauthored 40 books as well as more than 450 refereed technical papers in various scientific areas. He is associate editor of several scientific journals. He is a fellow of the International Fuzzy Systems Association (IFSA), fellow of the European Coordinating Committee for Artificial Intelligence (ECCAI) and fellow of the Institute of Electrical and Electronics Engineers (IEEE).

References

External links 
 Web pages of the Computational Intelligence group
 Personal Homepage
 Scientific Publications (DBLP)

Living people
1952 births
Fellows of the European Association for Artificial Intelligence